Do Me Right may refer to:

 Do Me Right (album), by the Detroit Emeralds
 "Do Me Right" (song), by The Detroit Emeralds
 "Do Me Right", a song by Jamelia from the 2006 album Walk with Me